1 Step Ahead of Yall is the debut album by rapper EA-Ski. It was originally released in 1992 for In a Minute Records, but was later re-released on February 16, 1999, through No Limit Records.

Track listing

References
 

1992 debut albums
Albums produced by E-A-Ski
No Limit Records albums
Priority Records albums
E-A-Ski albums